Carvey is a surname. Notable people with the surname include:

Brad Carvey (born 1951), American engineer
Dana Carvey (born 1955), American stand-up comedian, actor, impressionist, screenwriter, and producer

See also
Harvey (name)

English-language surnames